Banksia rufa subsp. chelomacarpa is a subspecies of Banksia rufa. It was known as Dryandra ferruginea subsp. chelomacarpa until 2007, when Austin Mast and Kevin Thiele sunk all Dryandra into Banksia. Since the name Banksia ferruginea had already been used, Mast and Thiele had to choose a new specific epithet for D. ferruginea and hence for this subspecies of it. As with other members of Banksia ser. Dryandra, it is endemic to the South West Botanical Province of Western Australia.

References

Further reading
 
 
 
 

rufa subsp. chelomacarpa
Plant subspecies